Bentot Jr. (born Luisito "Louie" Garcia Medina; January 8, 1970 – May 2, 2016) was a Filipino actor, and the adopted son of the late comedian Bentot. He had an older brother, Nick Medina, who is also known as Bentot Jr.

Background
Bentot Jr.'s first movie role was at the age of 3.5 yrs old and made 14 more movies up until 1985, when he left the film industry in favor of his studies. He returned to the industry in 2000 up to his last movie, Djagwar in 2011. He played "Lando" in Philippines' movie Panday. He made his first international appearance in the Bruceploitation movie The Return of Bruce with Bruce Le and Elizabeth Oropesa.

He won his first award in 1977 Metro Manila Film Festival as Best Child Performer from the movie Ang Lalake, Ang Alamat at ang Baril with actor Fernando Poe Jr. He has received three more trophies for the movies Tatak ng Tondo (1978), Ang Lihim ng Guadalupe (1979), Hoy Tukso Layuan Mo Ako (1980), with awards in 1978 as MMFF-Best Child Performer and two awards from FAMAS as Best Child Actor, respectively.

Personal life
Louie was a graduate of Far Eastern University, BSC Major in Management. He married at the age of 20 to Joni Peralta, became the father of two children, and then separated after three years. He was in a relationship with Teresa. They had one child together.

Bentot Jr. was an active member of the born-again Christian movement, where he was tasked with the evangelist integration for jail ministry, and was working as an agent servicing for Energy Supplier Company, an outsourcing industry company.

Death
Bentot Jr. died on May 5, 2016 in Manila, Philippines at the age of 46.

Filmography
1973 - Tama na Erap
1974 - Darna vs. Planet Woman (played as Ding)
1975 - Mark of the Dragon
1976 - The Return of the Dragon (1st International movie)
1977 - Ang Lalake, Ang Alamat at ang Baril (MMFF Awardee)
1978 - Super Text
1978 - Tatak ng Tondo (MMFF Awardee)
1979 - Ang Lihim ng Guadalupe (FAMAS Awardee)
1980 - Hoy Tukso Layuan Mo Ako (FAMAS Awardee)
1980 - Ang Panday
1981 - Pagbabalik ng Panday
1982 - Johnny Tanggo Rides Again... Tatanga-tanga, Dakila Naman
1982 - Ang Panday: Ikatlong Yugto
1984 - Ang Panday IV: Ika-Apat Na Aklat
1985 - Campus Beat
2000 - Most Wanted
2001 - Twosong Twosome 
2002 - Home Along the River
2011 - Dyagwar

References

External links

1970 births
2016 deaths
Far Eastern University alumni
Filipino male film actors
Filipino male child actors
Filipino male comedians